The Battle of Alfambra took place near Alfambra from 5 to 8 February 1938, during the Spanish Civil War. This battle was a part of the Battle of Teruel. After, the conquest of Teruel by the Republican army, the Nationalists started a counteroffensive in order to reocuppy Teruel. On 5 February a huge nationalist force broke the republican lines north of Teruel towards the Alfambra river, taking 7,000 republican prisoners and threatening the Republican forces in Teruel.

Background.
After the conquest of Teruel by the Republican army on 7 January, the Nationalists started an offensive in order to conquest the high ground around Teruel on 17 January and occupied the heights of La Muela, nevertheless the Republican troops led by Hernandez Saravia and backed by the International Brigades, stopped the Nationalist offensive on 27 January. Then, the Nationalists concentrated an army of 100,000 men and 500 guns in the Sierra de Palomera in the north of Teruel, led by the general Juan Vigon, with three Army Corps (Aranda’s Galicia corps, Yagüe's Morocco corps and the Garcia Valiño’s Navarre Corp), the Italian CTV and Monasterio’s cavalry division. On the other hand, the republican defenses in this part of the front were weak, since most of the republican troops were concentrated in the city of Teruel and the republican troops in this part of the front had never seen action. The Republican army had one Army corps, the 13th Army Corps here, with the 29th and the 42nd division.

Battle
On 5 February, launched a major offensive towards the Alfambra river, along a front of 30 kilometres. The attack started with a massive cavalry charge of the Monasterio’s division, the last great mounted charge in western Europe. The three nationalists army corps broke the Republican lines and advanced swiftly towards the Alfambra river. The Republican forces were surrounded by the nationalists or fled in disorder. By 7 February the Nationalists had conquered  and huge amounts of material (munitions, weapons and ambulances), and aircraft (twelve on 7 February alone). The Republicans had suffered 20,000-22,000 casualties, among them 7,000 prisoners.

Aftermath
By the 20 February the Republican communications to Valencia from Teruel were threatened by the Nationalists and Hernandez Saravia gave orders for withdrawal from the city, although the Republicans managed to form a defense line along the right bank of the Alfambra on 25 February.

See also 

 List of Spanish Nationalist military equipment of the Spanish Civil War
 List of weapons of the Corpo Truppe Volontarie
 List of Spanish Republican military equipment of the Spanish Civil War

Bibliography
Beevor, Antony. The Battle for Spain. The Spanish civil war, 1936-1939. Penguin Books. 2006. London. .
Thomas, Hugh. The Spanish Civil War. Penguin Books. 2001. London.

References

Alfambra
Alfambra
1938 in Spain
Alfambra
Province of Teruel
February 1938 events